Jon Peterson was a former Republican member of the Ohio House of Representatives, representing the 2nd District from 1999 to 2008. Peterson served as Delaware County Auditor, and also Delaware County Treasurer.

In 2020, a memorial plaza in Delaware was named in his honor.

References

1953 births
2019 deaths
Republican Party members of the Ohio House of Representatives
21st-century American politicians
People from Prescott, Wisconsin